The 1954 United States House of Representatives elections in Virginia were held on November 2, 1954 to determine who will represent the Commonwealth of Virginia in the United States House of Representatives. Virginia had ten seats in the House, apportioned according to the 1950 United States Census. Representatives are elected for two-year terms.

Overview

References

See also
 United States House elections, 1954

Virginia
1954
1954 Virginia elections